Elaan is a 2011 Indian, Bhojpuri language film written and directed by Dhiraj Kumar and produced by Rahul Roy. Manoj Tiwari, Rahul Roy and Joginder Tiwari are in lead roles. Gajendra Chauhan and Lovy Rohtagi in supporting roles.

Plot
Natha Singh is an operative of a Naxal gang that aids various politicians. But, soon a police inspector and a common man join hands to break the nexus.

Cast
 Manoj Tiwari, as SP Sooryadev Singh
 Rahul Roy, as Army Officer
 Joginder Tiwari, as Mritunjay 
 Pankaj Kesari as Sooryadev's assistant
 Gajendra Chouhan, as Home Minister
 Vishnu Shankar Belu, as Natha Singh
 Prem Shandilya, as Laccho's brother
 Lovy Rohtagi, as Laccho
 Mona Batra, as SP Sooryadev Singh's wife
 Lavina Lodh

References

2011 films
2010s Bhojpuri-language films